The Hotel Grand Chancellor was a major four-star hotel in the centre of Christchurch in New Zealand, one of eleven Hotel Grand Chancellor establishments across Australia and New Zealand. The hotel was located at 161 Cashel Street, close to the city's City Mall central shopping precinct.

The building was built in 1986 for office use by Forbes Construction. In 1996 it was converted to a hotel by Fletchers Construction with 15 floors of hotel accommodation, and 12 floors of car parking, also housing conference facilities for businesses.

The building suffered severe damage from an earthquake in 2011 and was demolished in 2012. Initial plans to rebuild the hotel were replaced by a shopping and office complex. Another hotel is planned to be built at another location.

Christchurch earthquakes
The hotel survived the September 2010 earthquake without any known structural damage, but was badly damaged by the February 2011 Christchurch earthquake five months later.

The collapse of a key supporting shear wall "D5-6" located in the south-east corner of the building led to the visible leaning of the building to one side. It also contributed to the staircases (above level 14) collapsing. Above the 14th floor, 36 people were trapped and spent several hours in the damaged building during a series of large aftershocks before being all successfully rescued.

Fear that the building would totally collapse hampered search and rescue missions in the vicinity. The building was eventually stabilised and on 4 March it was decided the building would be demolished over the following six months using a complicated deconstruction processes from the top downwards. The roof of the hotel was removed in early November 2011.  A protective fence was to be built around the building to catch debris from the demolition and then the demolition of the building was to proceed from January 2012. The hotel was demolished by Ward Demolition.

Rebuild
The Grand Hotels International, owners of the former Hotel Grand Chancellor, Christchurch gained city council approval to rebuild on the site. The new design was from Warren and Mahoney architects and was to be built by Fletcher Construction, and finished by 2015.

In April 2014, it was announced that the hotel would not be rebuilt on its original site, and would be replaced by shops and offices instead. The Grand Hotels International group expressed interest in building the hotel on a different site in the city.

In September 2019, Grand Central confirmed that a replacement hotel would be on a new site on the southwest corner of Manchester and Armagh streets.

References

External links

Christchurchnz.com HGC page
Department of Building and Housing Report on the Structural Performance of the Hotel Grand Chancellor (PDF 15.4 MB, 87 pages)
 Related photos etc. at the Canterbury Earthquake Digital Archive

Grand Hotels International
Buildings and structures demolished as a result of the 2011 Christchurch earthquake
Buildings and structures demolished in 2012
Hotel buildings completed in 1986
1986 establishments in New Zealand
2011 disestablishments in New Zealand
Skyscrapers in Christchurch
Defunct hotels in New Zealand
1980s architecture in New Zealand
Hotels in Christchurch
Skyscraper hotels in New Zealand
Demolished hotels
Former skyscrapers
Brutalist architecture in New Zealand